Lalabad-e Hoseyn-e Qolikhani (also Romanized as Lā‘lābād-e Ḩoseyn-e Qolīkhānī) is a village in Mahidasht Rural District, Mahidasht District, Kermanshah County, Kermanshah Province, Iran. At the 2006 census, its population was 414, in 83 families.

References 

Populated places in Kermanshah County